Madonna in the Vine Arbour is a circa 1541–1543, unsigned painting by Hans Baldung. It is on display in the Musée de l'Œuvre Notre-Dame. Its inventory number is MBA 536 ("MBA" stands for Musée des Beaux-Arts).

It is the last of Baldung's depictions of the Virgin and Child and displays characteristic features of the painter's own brand of mannerism, such as strong contrasts between pale skins and dark backgrounds, and the combination of natural gestures and artificial poses. The painting may have been commissioned by a Protestant patron, which would account for the modesty (both in size and in clothing) of the figure of Mary. By contrast, slightly earlier Baldung works of the same type (such as the Nuremberg version, or the Berlin version) had depicted Mary as a dominant, sensuous semi-nude.

References

External links 

Vierge à la treille , presentation on the museum's website

1540s paintings
Paintings in the Musée de l'Œuvre Notre-Dame
Paintings by Hans Baldung
Paintings in the collection of the Musée des Beaux-Arts de Strasbourg
Oil paintings
Paintings of the Madonna and Child